Pontllanfraith A.F.C. were a Welsh football club from the large village and community located in the Sirhowy Valley in Caerphilly county borough, Wales, within the historic boundaries of Monmouthshire and situated adjacent to the town of Blackwood. They played in the Welsh Football League and were associated with South Wales Switchgear, a major employer in the area who specialised in electrical equipment. In 1992 they merged with Fields Park to form Fields Park Pontllanfraith.

Honours

Welsh Football League Premier Division (Tier 1 Welsh Football Pyramid) – Champions: 1978–79
Welsh Football League Premier Division (Tier 1 Welsh Football Pyramid) – Runners-Up: 1980–81
Welsh Football League Division One (Tier 2 Welsh Football Pyramid) – Champions: 1973–74
Welsh Football League Division One (Tier 2 Welsh Football Pyramid) – Runners-Up: 1964–65
Welsh League Division Two East (Tier 2 Welsh Football Pyramid) – Champions (2): 1952–53; 1963–64
Welsh Football League Division Two (Tier 3 Welsh Football Pyramid) – Champions: 1972–73
Welsh Football League Cup – Winners: 1979–80; 1984–85
Welsh Football League Cup – Runners-Up: 1977–78; 1978–79

Welsh Football League history
Information sourced from the Football Club History Database for Pontllanfraith and South Wales Switchgear, and the Welsh Soccer Archive.

Notes

References

Football clubs in Wales
Association football clubs disestablished in 1992
Defunct football clubs in Wales
1992 disestablishments in Wales
Welsh Football League clubs
Works association football teams in Wales